This is a list of public art on permanent public display in Brisbane, Queensland, Australia.

The list applies only to works of public art accessible in an outdoor public space; it does not include artwork on display inside museums. Public art may include sculptures, statues, monuments, memorials, murals and mosaics.

This list does not include military and war memorials.

List of sculptures

List of statues

List of monuments and memorials

See also

List of Australian military memorials
List of public art in the City of Sydney
 Alphie the Alpha Turtle, a large moveable inflatable floating public artwork

References

External links 

Lists of buildings and structures in Brisbane
Brisbane
Culture of Brisbane
Public art in Brisbane
Monuments and memorials in Brisbane
Lists of tourist attractions in Queensland